RV Falkor (too)  is an oceanographic research vessel being refit in 2021–2022 from the former multi-role offshore support vessel MS Polar Queen. The ship was purchased by the Schmidt Ocean Institute in March 2021. It replaced the RV Falkor.

Building and Delivery
The Norwegian company Sea4 AS had ordered two new vessels to be built by the C.N.P. Freire shipyard in Vigo (Spain) in November 2007. The design for the two vessels was developed by the Norwegian naval architect and ship design company Skipsteknisk AS and called ST-254L CD. It is similar to the previously developed design ST-253, which was realized as hull number 701 at the Freire Shipyard as well. This shorter vessel- the Volstad Surveyor was later converted at the Damen shipyard and became the OceanXplorer 1.

It was scheduled that the vessels with the hull numbers 702 and 703 would be delivered in February and August 2010 and operated by the two subsidiaries Sea4 I Shipping Ltd. and Sea 4 II Shipping Ltd. The keel for hull number 703 - the later Polar Queen was laid at the 11. December 2008. However, there was a six months delay due to the global financial crisis. In September 2009, it was announced that GC Rieber Shipping had taken over Sea4's subsidiaries for a total of approximately 800 million NOK because at that time, no chartering agreements had been entered into for the newbuildings. Finally the Polar Queen was taken by GC Rieber at the 6. October 2011.

Service
GC Rieber had signed a two-year charter contract with Oceanografía S.A. de C.V. for the Mexican state oil company Pemex, starting Offshore services in the Gulf of Mexico in November 2011. But before the contract expired a Maritime lien arose between GC Rieber and Oceanografía. As a consequence a federal judge in Texas has told a United States Marshal to seize the vessel.

Starting in October 2012, the Polar Queen was chartered by Boa Marine Services Inc. which was based in Houston TX and a subsidiary of the Norwegian BOA Offshore AS. The charter contract was later prolonged beyond April 2015.

From April to December 2017, the ship was used to transport equipment and personnel for the construction of the Nordsee One offshore wind farm in the German North Sea.

From 2018 to 2020, the Polar Queen was used for so called walk-to-work and accommodation services in the North Sea during the summer months.

An active heave compensated gangway mounted on board the vessel, allowed technicians and engineers to walk to Normally unmanned installations, e.g. the offshore riser platform Forties Unity in the Forties Oil Field, to perform scheduled maintenance or repairs. When their shift was over, they could walk back to the vessel where they had their accommodation.

Sale and refit

GC Rieber announced the sale of the vessel on 23. February 2021 and the Schmidt Ocean Institute confirmed the purchase one month later. The vessel sailed to Spain and arrived at Vigo in April 2021 to commence the refit.

 RV Falkor
 ROV SuBastian

References

External links
 

Research vessels
Research vessels of the United States
2011 ships
Ships built in Vigo, Spain